Pantperthog is a hamlet in southern Gwynedd in Wales, 2 miles north of Machynlleth and 14 miles southeast of Dolgellau. Nearby is the former Llwyngwern quarry, which is now the Centre for Alternative Technology.

Governance 
Pantperthog has a community council, elected by residents. The community council system replaced the parish council system; the council tackles local issues and acts as a contact point between local government and residents for information and resource on many environmental, equality, ethnicity and gender issues and other matters.

Forestry
The village has strong forestry connections, with part of the Dyfi Forest to the rear of the village.

Transport
The A487 trunk road passes through Pantperthog en route to Machynlleth and Dolgellau.

References

External links

 Corris Community Council

Villages in Gwynedd